"Right Now (Na Na Na)" is the lead single from Akon's third studio album, Freedom. The song contains elements from "Remember" by Summer Love. The song was added to the U.S. Mainstream Top 40 radio airing on September 23, 2008, and also became available for digital download on iTunes that day. The song was intended to have a Euro-club feel.

History
In 2009 dutch producers dj Maurice Huismans and Jorrit ter Braak started a lawsuit agains Akon and his co-writer Giorgio Tuinfort because they claimed this song was stolen from them. 
Their song Remember (na na hey) by the act Summerlove was a hit in Europe in 2001 and later covered by the Underdog Project and Spanish singer David Tavare as the song 'Summerlove'. 
In 2010 the dutch plagiarism committee approved this claim and all parties settled afterwards.

Official versions
Several remixes of the track exist. The official remix of the track features additional vocals by Kat DeLuna. Further remixes include "Mañana (Na Na Na)", featuring vocals from Jayko, and an International Remix, featuring Canadian singer Danny Fernandes.

Music video
The official music video for the track was directed by Anthony Mandler and released on November 6, 2008. It premiered in Germany on the TV show Viva Live. In the video, Akon plays an agent that is on a mission, he has to find a girl (the same from his video "Don't Matter") that has secret information. He remembers the good times that he spent with his ex-girlfriend, played by Jamaican model Cindy Wright, but he sleeps with the girl from "Don't Matter", gets the information and ends the video alone. The actual track begins one minute after the video begins, making the video over 5 minutes in length.

Charts

Weekly charts

Year-end charts

Certifications

Asking Alexandria cover

British rock band Asking Alexandria covered the track for the compilation album Punk Goes Pop 3, which was released on November 2, 2010. It was available for digital download on September 29, 2010.

Other versions
A Tagalog parody version, entitled "Banana (Ba Na Na)", was recorded by Filipino rapper Blank Tape. Another Malaysian parody or remake was also performed by Kelantanese singers Man Khan and Rosalinda, entitled "Dok Mano" released at the near end of 2012 sung in the Kelantanese dialect of the Malaysian language.

References

2008 singles
Akon songs
Music videos directed by Anthony Mandler
Songs written by Akon
Asking Alexandria songs
2008 songs
Universal Motown Records singles
Songs written by Giorgio Tuinfort